The 2018–19 FC Pune City season is the club's fifth season since its establishment in 2014 and their fifth season in the Indian Super League. This was the club's last season in the Indian Super League.

Background

Transfers

Contract Extension

In

Out

Pre-season and friendlies
FC Pune City  kicked -off their pre-season preparations by participating in the second edition of the AWES Cup in Goa from 29 August 2018.

In the last edition of AWES Cup, FC Pune City Reserves squad went up to semifinals before losing to Dempo Sports Club 1–0. But this time around, the club has decided to participate in the event with their entire first team squad. FC Pune City is placed along with Dempo SC, Salgaocar FC and FC Goa in Group A.

Players

Appearances and goals

|-
! colspan=10 style=background:#dcdcdc; text-align:center| Goalkeepers

|-
! colspan=10 style=background:#dcdcdc; text-align:center| Defenders
|-

|-
! colspan=10 style=background:#dcdcdc; text-align:center| Midfielders

|-
! colspan=10 style=background:#dcdcdc; text-align:center| Forwards

|-

Competitions

Indian Super League

Table

Matches

League stage

Technical staff

References

FC Pune City seasons
Pune City